Xu Jiamin (born 11 April 1994) is a Chinese footballer who currently plays as a goalkeeper for Chinese Super League side Tianjin Jinmen Tiger.

Club career
Xu Jiamin started his professional football career in 2011 when he was loaned to Shanghai Zobon's squad for the 2011 China League Two campaign.  He joined Chinese Super League side Guizhou Renhe in July 2012. On 11 November 2018, he made his Chinese Super League debut in a 0–0 home draw against Guangzhou R&F.

On 28 February 2019, Xu was loaned to China League One side Heilongjiang FC for the 2019 season.

On 9 July 2020, Xu signed with Dalian Pro.

Career statistics
.

References

External links
 

1994 births
Living people
Chinese footballers
Footballers from Shanghai
Pudong Zobon players
Beijing Renhe F.C. players
Heilongjiang Ice City F.C. players
Dalian Professional F.C. players
China League Two players
China League One players
Chinese Super League players
Association football goalkeepers
Footballers at the 2014 Asian Games
Asian Games competitors for China